Dhiddhoo as a place name may refer to:
 Dhiddhoo (Alif Dhaal Atoll), Maldives
 Dhiddhoo (Haa Alif Atoll), Maldives
 Dhiddhoo, an uninhabited island in Lhaviyani Atoll, Maldives